Manishankar Ratnji Bhatt, popularly known as Kavi Kant was a Gujarati poet, playwright and essayist. He is an innovator of Khandkavya, a typical Gujarati poetic form and narration of one episode. His book Purvalap (1923) is a landmark in Gujarati poetry.

Life
Kavi Kant was born in Prashnora Brahman Family on 20 November 1867 in Chavand, a village in Amreli Prant of Baroda state, to Motibahen and Ratnaji Bhatt. His family's influence left him with a deep interest in both education and philosophy. He was a student of both Hindu and Biblical philosophy. He took his primary education at Mangrol, Morbi and Rajkot. He completed his Bachelor of Arts in 1888 from Bombay University with Logic and  Moral philosophy subjects. He served as a teacher at Surat in 1889. From 1890 to 1898, he served as Professor and then Vice principal at Kalabhavan, Vadodara. He was on tour to Kashmir in 1923. While returning to Lahore from Rawalpindi in train, he died en route on 16 June 1923.

Conversion
In 1891 his first wife Narmada died. The death of his wife affected Kant deeply, and he could not find solace in his own religion. His search for answers about life and death led him to the philosophy of Emanuel Swedenborg. His writings provided some relief for his grief and he converted to Christianity in 1898. His family and friends opposed his decision and due to public and political opposition, he had to give up his position as minister of education in the Bhavnagar State. The community shunned both him and his family. Kant took the decision to leave the community and his family, for the sake of his wife and children. Realizing the repercussions of Kant's decision, the King of Bhavnagar along with some of his friends formed an "intervention" of sorts to ask him to change his mind.  He realized that he could not stand to see his family suffer because of this decision. He missed them dearly and did not want to be apart from them.

Literary work

He wrote one poetry book called Purvalap (1923) that was released on the day he died. He invented a form of poetry called "Khand-Kavya", one type of Narrative poetry, in Gujarati. He also wrote the plays Salimshah Athva Ashrumati, Roman-Swarajya, Dukhi Sansar and Guru Govindsinh between 1908 and 1914.

References

External links
 

Gujarati-language writers
Indian male dramatists and playwrights
19th-century Indian dramatists and playwrights
Gujarati-language poets
Indian male poets
Dramatists and playwrights from Gujarat
People from Amreli district
1867 births
1923 deaths
19th-century Indian essayists
20th-century Indian essayists
Indian male essayists
20th-century Indian poets
19th-century Indian poets
19th-century Indian male writers
Poets from Gujarat
20th-century Indian male writers